Amanda Ann Johnstone (born 30 September 1972) is an Australian politician who was a Labor Party member of the Legislative Assembly of Queensland from 2009 to 2012 representing Townsville. Mandy Johnstone is also the first female politician elected to the seat of Townsville.

References

1972 births
Living people
Members of the Queensland Legislative Assembly
Australian Labor Party members of the Parliament of Queensland
21st-century Australian politicians
Women members of the Queensland Legislative Assembly
21st-century Australian women politicians